Entschenkopf is a mountain in the Allgäu Alps of Bavaria, Germany. Its mountain ridge, which stretches southwards, forms the eastern boundary of the Gaisalp valley. The Entschenkopf can be reached both from the north (from the Falkenjoch) and from the south (from the Upper Gaisalp Lake).

References

Mountains of Bavaria
Mountains of the Alps